Jeff Graham (born February 5, 1966) is a former American football quarterback who played five seasons in the National Football League with the San Diego Chargers, Seattle Seahawks and Oakland Raiders. He was drafted by the Green Bay Packers in the fourth round of the 1989 NFL Draft. He played college football at California State University, Long Beach and attended Estancia High School in Costa Mesa, California. Graham was also a member of the New York/New Jersey Knights of the World League of American Football. He was inducted into the Long Beach State Athletic Hall of Fame in 2004.

Professional career

Green Bay Packers
Graham was drafted 87th overall in the 1989 NFL Draft by the Green Bay Packers.  He was the sixth quarterback taken in the draft and the second quarterback taken by the Packers in the draft as Anthony Dilweg was drafted in the previous round.  Graham was traded on draft day to the Washington Redskins for wide receiver Erik Affholter and two draft picks.

Washington Redskins 
Graham entered the Washington Redskins' training camp to battle out Stan Humphries for the 3rd string quarterback position behind Doug Williams and Mark Rypien.  He was waived on August 30.

Cleveland Browns
Graham was picked up by the Cleveland Browns and assigned to their developmental squad for the 1989 season.  Graham resigned for the 1990 season however a rotator cuff injury placed him on injured reserve for the season.

New York/New Jersey Knights WLAF
Graham's greatest professional success came as starting quarterback of the World League of American Football New York/New Jersey Knights where he started 9 of 10 games played and threw for 2407 yards completing 157 of 272 attempts with eight touchdowns and eight interceptions.  He added 140 yards rushing on 24 carries and led the Knights into the playoffs where they lost to the eventual league champion London Monarchs.  Graham posted World League postseason record of 399 yards including two touchdowns in the 42-26 loss.

San Diego Chargers
For the 1991 season, Graham was signed to the San Diego Chargers' practice squad following a tour of duty with the WLAF.  Graham was promoted to the 47 man roster December 1 after an injury to starting quarterback John Friesz.  The 1992 season gave Graham an opportunity to compete for the starting position with Friez and Pat O'Hara, but in the end, Graham was let go in August cut downs.

Indianapolis Colts
Graham was briefly picked up by the Indianapolis Colts on September 17 1992 following his release from the Chargers.  He spent a little over a week with the practice squad before being waived from the squad on September 24.

Seattle Seahawks
On October 15 1992 Graham was picked up by the Seattle Seahawks and assigned to the practice squad.  He was released from the practice squad on November 4.

Atlanta Falcons
Following his release from the Seahawks practice squad the Atlanta Falcons signed Graham to their practice squad November 18 1992, he was subsequently picked up by Seattle and signed to their active roster.

Seattle Seahawks (second stint)
On December 17 1992 Graham returned to the Seahawks after the retirement of Rusty Hilger and Graham was the Seahawks 3rd string quarterback behind Stan Gelbaugh and Kelly Stouffer.  Graham was on and off with the Seahawks through the 1994 season bouncing between the practice squad and inactive roster.

Oakland Raiders
Graham's last year in the NFL came with the Oakland Raiders for the 1995 season.  Once Jeff Hostetler was placed on injured reserve in December Graham was promoted to the third-string quarterback position.  He was not retained for the 1996 season

References

External links
Just Sports Stats
College stats

Living people
1966 births
Players of American football from California
American football quarterbacks
Long Beach State 49ers football players
New York/New Jersey Knights players
People from Costa Mesa, California
Washington Redskins players
Cleveland Browns players
San Diego Chargers players
Sportspeople from Orange County, California
Indianapolis Colts players
Atlanta Falcons players
Seattle Seahawks players
Oakland Raiders players